The Jinbanjing Tianhou Temple is a Mazu temple in Ren'ai Village, Nangan Township, Lienchiang County, Taiwan.

History
The temple was constructed around 400 years ago. Over the years, the temple has undergone several renovation works. It was registered as historic landmark of Lienchiang County in 2009.

Architecture
The temple was constructed with eastern Fujian traditional architectural style. It consists of ancient firewalls and interior courtyard with wooden structure. Its interior was constructed from Fuzhou fir using column and tie beam system. The roof was constructed with extended eaves.

See also
 Qianliyan & Shunfeng'er
 List of Mazu temples around the world
 List of temples in Taiwan
 List of tourist attractions in Taiwan

References

Tourist attractions in Lienchiang County
Mazu temples in Lienchiang County